Isham Trotter Hardy (March 28, 1899 – January 23, 1983) was a professional American football player for the National Football League's Akron Pros and Akron Indians. He played in a total of three games between the 1923 and 1926 seasons after his collegiate career at William & Mary.

References

1899 births
1983 deaths
Akron Indians players
Akron Pros players
People from Blackstone, Virginia
Players of American football from Richmond, Virginia
William & Mary Tribe football players